The United States ambassador to Tonga is the official representative of the government of the United States to the government of Tonga. The ambassador is concurrently the ambassador to Fiji, Kiribati, Nauru, and Tuvalu, while residing in Suva, Fiji.

Ambassadors

See also
Tonga – United States relations
Foreign relations of Tonga
Ambassadors of the United States

References
United States Department of State: Background notes on Tonga

External links
 United States Department of State: Chiefs of Mission for Tonga
 United States Department of State: Tonga
Virtual Consulate Kingdom of Tonga: United States Embassy in Suva

 
Tonga
United States